Isabelle Yasmina Adjani ; born 27 June 1955) is a French actress and singer of Algerian and German descent. She is the only performer in history to win five César Awards for acting; she won the Best Actress award for Possession (1981), One Deadly Summer (1983), Camille Claudel (1988), La Reine Margot (1994) and Skirt Day (2009). She was made a Knight of France's Legion of Honour in 2010 and a Commander of the Order of Arts and Letters in 2014.

Her performance as Adèle Hugo in the 1975 film The Story of Adèle H. earned then 20-year-old Adjani her first Academy Award nomination for Best Actress, making her the youngest nominee in the Best Actress category at the time. Her second nomination—for Camille Claudel–made her the first French actress to receive two nominations for foreign-language films. She won the Best Actress award at the 1981 Cannes Film Festival for her performances in Possession and Quartet, and, later, she won the Best Actress award at the 39th Berlin International Film Festival for Camille Claudel. Her other notable film performances include The Tenant (1976), Nosferatu the Vampyre (1979), Subway (1985), Diabolique (1996) and French Women (2014).

Early life and education
Isabelle Yasmina Adjani was born on 27 June 1955 in the 17th arrondissement of Paris, to Mohammed Cherif Adjani, an Algerian Kabyle from Constantine, and Emma Augusta "Gusti" Schweinberger, a German Catholic from Bavaria.

Adjani's parents met near the end of World War II, when her father was in the French Army. They married and her mother returned with him to Paris, despite not speaking a word of French. She asked him to take Cherif as his first name as she thought it sounded more "American".

Isabelle grew up bilingual, speaking French and German fluently, in Gennevilliers, a northwestern suburb of Paris, where her father worked in a garage. After winning a school recitation contest, Adjani began acting by the age of 12 in amateur theater. She successfully passed her baccalauréat and was auditing classes at the University of Vincennes in 1976.

Adjani had a younger brother, Éric, who was a photographer. He died on 25 December 2010, aged 53.

Acting career

At the age of 14, Adjani starred in her first motion picture, Le Petit Bougnat (1970). She first gained fame as a classical actress at the Comédie-Française, which she joined in 1972. She was praised for her interpretation of Agnès, the main female role in Molière's L'École des femmes. She soon left the theatre to pursue a film career.

After minor roles in several films, she enjoyed modest success in the 1974 film La Gifle (The Slap), which François Truffaut saw. He immediately cast her in her first major role in his The Story of Adèle H. (1975) which he had finished writing five years prior. Critics praised her performance, with the American critic Pauline Kael describing her acting talents as "prodigious".

Only 19 when she made the film, Adjani was nominated for the Academy Award for Best Actress in a Leading Role, becoming the youngest Best Actress nominee at the time (a record she held for almost 30 years). She quickly received offers for roles in Hollywood films, such as Walter Hill's 1978 crime thriller The Driver. She had previously turned down the chance to star in films like The Other Side of Midnight. She had described Hollywood as a "city of fiction" and said, "I'm not an American. I didn't grow up with that will to win an award." Truffaut on the other hand said, "France is too small for her. I think Isabelle is made for American cinema." She agreed to make The Driver because she was an admirer of Hill's first film Hard Times. Adjani said:
I think he is wonderful, very much in the tradition of Howard Hawks, lean and spare. The story is contemporary but also very stylized, and the roles that Ryan and I play are like Bogart and Bacall. We are both gamblers in our souls and we do not show our emotions or say a lot. For us, talk is cheap. I am really quite a mysterious girl in this film, with no name and no background. And I must say that it is restful not to have a life behind me; this way, I don't have to dig deep to play the part. All I know is that life for me is gambling and I am a loser. I have what people call a poker face.
The film was seen more than 1.1 million times in Adjani's native France but did not do as well in the US.

She played Lucy in the German director Werner Herzog's 1979 remake of Nosferatu which was well-received critically and performed well at box offices in Europe. Roger Ebert loved the film, calling Herzog's casting of Adjani one of his "masterstrokes" in the film. He wrote that she "is used here not only for her facial perfection but for her curious quality of seeming to exist on an ethereal plane." The cast and the crew filmed both English- and German-language versions simultaneously upon request of 20th Century Fox, the American distributor, as Kinski and Ganz could act more confidently in their native language.

In 1981, she received a double Cannes Film Festival's Best Actress award for her roles in the Merchant Ivory film Quartet, based on the novel by Jean Rhys, and in the horror film Possession (1981). The following year, she received her first César Award for Possession, in which she had portrayed a woman having a nervous breakdown. In 1983, she won her second César for her depiction of a vengeful woman in the French blockbuster One Deadly Summer. That same year, Adjani released the French pop album Pull marine, written and produced by Serge Gainsbourg. She starred in a music video for the hit title song, "Pull Marine", which was directed by Luc Besson.

In 1988, she co-produced and starred in a biopic of the sculptor Camille Claudel. She received her third César and second Oscar nomination for her role in the film, becoming the first French actress to receive two Oscar nominations. The film was also nominated for the Academy Award for Best Foreign Language Film.

She received her fourth César for the 1994 film Queen Margot, an ensemble epic directed by Patrice Chéreau. She received her fifth César for Skirt Day (2009), the most that any actress has received. The film features her as a middle school teacher in a troubled French suburb who takes her class hostage when she accidentally fires off a gun she found on one of her students. It was premiered on the French Arte channel on 20 March 2009, attaining a record 2.2 million viewers) and then in movie theaters on 25 March 2009. The film was her return to the cinema after eight years of absence. In 2010, she made an appearance in the social comedy Mammuth, from directors Benoît Delépine and Gustave Kervern, and in which she played the phantom of Gérard Depardieu's first love. The same year, she lent her voice to the character of Mother Gothel in the animated film Rapunzel. In 2011, she co-starred in De Force, the first film directed by Frank Henry. She embodied the commander Clara Damico, head of the brigade for the repression of banditry.

Personal life
In 1979, Adjani had a son, Barnabé Saïd-Nuytten, with the cinematographer Bruno Nuytten, whom she later hired to direct her project Camille Claudel, a biopic of the sculptor who was the lover of Rodin.

From 1989 to 1995, she had a relationship with Daniel Day-Lewis, which ended before the birth of their son, Gabriel-Kane Day-Lewis, in 1995.

Adjani was later engaged to the composer Jean-Michel Jarre; they broke up in 2004.

Political views
Adjani has been vocal against anti-immigrant and anti-Algerian sentiment in France. In 2009, she criticized statements by Pope Benedict XVI, who claimed that condoms are not an effective method of AIDS prevention.

In September 2009, she signed a petition in support of Roman Polanski, calling for his release after he was arrested in Switzerland in relation to his 1977 charge for drugging and raping a 13-year-old girl.

In 2017, Adjani was interviewed by Vincent Josse on the French public radio station France Inter. During the interview, she expressed her vaccine hesitancy and opposition to mandatory vaccination.

Honors
In addition to specific awards for particular films, Adjani was made a Knight of France's Legion of Honour on 14 July 2010 for her contributions to the arts.

Filmography

Music video 
 1984: Pull marine by Luc Besson.
 2019: Meet Me By The Gates by The Penelopes and Isabelle Adjani.

See also
 Maghrebian community of Paris
List of oldest and youngest Academy Award winners and nominees – Youngest nominees for Best Actress in a Leading Role
List of actors with Academy Award nominations
List of French Academy Award winners and nominees

 Legion of Honour
 Legion of Honour Museum 
 List of Legion of Honour recipients by name (A)
 Ribbons of the French military and civil awards

References

Further reading
 Adjani, Isabelle (1980). Isabelle Adjani in : Jean-Luc Douin (Hrsg.): Comédiennes aujourd'hui : au micro et sous le regard. Paris: Lherminier. 
 Austin, Guy (2003). Foreign bodies: Jean Seberg and Isabelle Adjani, S. 91–106 in: ders., Stars in Modern French Film. London: Arnold. 
 Austin, Guy (2006). Telling the truth can be a dangerous business : Isabelle Adjani, race and stardom, in : Remapping World Cinema : Identity, Culture and Politics in Film, herausgegeben von Stephanie Dennison und Song Hwee Lim, London: Wallflower Press. 
 Halberstadt, Michèle (2002). Adjani aux pieds nus – Journal de la repentie. Paris: Editions Calmann-Lévy. 
 Roques-Briscard, Christian (1987). La passion d'Adjani, Lausanne et al.: Favre. 
 Zurhorst, Meinolf (1992). Isabelle Adjani : ihre Filme, ihr Leben. Heyne Film- und Fernsehbibliothek, Band 163. München: Heyne. 
 Rissa, Alvaro (pseudonimo di Walter Lapini) (2015), Ode an Isabelle, in Antologia della letteratura greca e Latina, Genova: Il Melangolo. 
d'Estais, Jérôme Possession, Tentatives d'exorcisme, Editions Rouge profond, 2019

External links

 
 

1955 births
Living people
People from Hauts-de-Seine
Actresses from Paris
Best Actress César Award winners
Cannes Film Festival Award for Best Actress winners
David di Donatello winners
French women singers
French women pop singers
French film actresses
French people of German descent
Best Actress Lumières Award winners
Troupe of the Comédie-Française
Lounge musicians
20th-century French actresses
21st-century French actresses
Silver Bear for Best Actress winners
English-language singers from France
German-language singers
Chevaliers of the Légion d'honneur
French stage actresses
Cours Florent alumni
Commandeurs of the Ordre des Arts et des Lettres
French people of Kabyle descent
French expatriates in Switzerland
Actresses of Algerian descent
French expatriates in India
Actresses in Hindi cinema
European actresses in India
Actresses of European descent in Indian films
Day-Lewis family